Project Natick is an experimental data center undergoing research and development by Microsoft. Microsoft deployed its first undersea data center prototype in August 2015. It has subsequently deployed and retrieved a "shipping-container" sized data center off the coast of the Northern Isles. Microsoft subcontracted Naval Group to spearhead the design and manufacture of the vessel.

History 
In 2013, a Microsoft employee with previous experience in the US Navy suggested that an underwater farm server could cut on cooling costs and increase environmental sustainability. A white paper written by employees began to circulate to promote the idea.

Phase I 
In late 2014, the project was launched with a meeting in Redmond, Washington. The first prototype was named Leona Philpot (named after a character from the Xbox Halo video game series) and was deployed off the coast of California on August, 10, 2015. The prototype was placed 30 feet underwater. The trial lasted 105 days and the prototype was successfully lifted out of the water for further testing. Following the initial experiment, Microsoft wanted the next prototype to be larger in size, deployed in harsher conditions, and powered with renewable energy.

Phase II 
Microsoft invited a group of marine organization to submit proposals to realize the second phase of the project. Naval Group, a French defense contractor, was selected to lead in the design and deployment of the project. The Natick Phase 2 vessel was deployed in June 1, 2018 off the coast of Orkney. The vessel stayed underwater for over two years. During the COVID-19 pandemic, the undersea data center was employed to process workloads for vaccine research via Folding@home. In July 2020, the vessel was successfully lifted out of the water and retrieved for analysis.

Impact 
Scottish Renewables awarded Microsoft the Carbon Reduction Award in 2018. Additionally, the project showed that 864 servers could run reliably for two years with cooling provided by the natural sea temperature. A United States Department of Energy report used Project Natick as an example that "marine energy combined with storage and potentially other renewable energy sources could provide the power or partial power for [data centers]."

References 

Data centers
Microsoft